Marvin Crosby "Moose" Bass (August 28, 1919 – December 3, 2010) was the head coach of The College of William & Mary's football team in 1951. He also coached the South Carolina Gamecocks football team for five seasons.

Bass, a native of Petersburg, Virginia, was a member of the winningest football team in William & Mary history.  Bass captained the 1942 Indians, which compiled a 9–1–1 record.  He later was an assistant coach at his alma mater when the 1947 Indians were 9–1.
 
In 1974, Bass was an assistant football coach for the Birmingham Americans of the World Football League (WFL), a league formed in the early 1970s to rival the National Football League (WLF). He became head coach of the WFL's Birmingham Vulcans the following year. The league lured such NFL name players as Larry Csonka, Paul Warfield and Jim Kiick.  It lasted 18 months, losing US$30 million.
 
In his 37-year coaching career, Bass coached in more football leagues than most coaches of his time.  This included stints as head coach for teams in the Southern Conference, Atlantic Coast Conference, Continental League, and the Canadian League.  Bass was also assistant coach with the Calgary Stampeders of the Canadian League.
 
While at William & Mary, Bass was All-State and All-Southern Conference while helping the Indians to defeat the Oklahoma Sooners 14–7 in the final 1942 game.  He served as head football coach at William & Mary as well as South Carolina and helped bring American football to Canada when he coached the Montreal Beavers in the Continental Football League.

Bass was inducted into the Virginia Sports Hall of Fame in 1981.

Head coaching record

College football

References

External links
 

1919 births
2010 deaths
Atlanta Falcons coaches
Birmingham Americans coaches
Birmingham Vulcans coaches
Buffalo Bills coaches
Calgary Stampeders coaches
Continental Football League coaches
Denver Broncos coaches
Georgia Tech Yellow Jackets football coaches
New York Giants coaches
North Carolina Tar Heels football coaches
Richmond Spiders football coaches
San Francisco 49ers scouts
South Carolina Gamecocks athletic directors
South Carolina Gamecocks football coaches
Washington Redskins coaches
William & Mary Tribe baseball coaches
William & Mary Tribe football players
William & Mary Tribe football coaches
Sportspeople from Petersburg, Virginia